Suixi County is a county in the north of Anhui Province, China, bordering Henan province to the southeast. It is under the administration of Huaibei City.

Administrative divisions
Nowadays, Suixi County is divided to  10 towns and 1 township.
10 Towns

1 Township
 Sibo

Climate

References

Huaibei